Robert Castel (1 August 1933 – 12 March 2013) was a French sociologist and researcher at the École des hautes études en sciences sociales.

Academic career
Castel was born in Saint-Pierre-Quilbignon, now part of Brest.  He initially studied philosophy in the late 1950s. In the late 1960s, he met Pierre Bourdieu and began working with him in sociology. His initial work dealt with psychology and psychiatry, establishing a critical sociology of these issues and linking this work to Michel Foucault, particularly to his 'genealogical approach'. He further dealt with  exclusion, or rather what he called the 'disaffiliation', which affects individuals 'by default'.

His later and perhaps best known work examined how the wage system, which at first was despised, has gradually established itself as the reference model and has been progressively associated with social protections, and the concept of social property, creating a constitutive status of 'social identity'. Castel was responsible for the formation of Le Groupe d'analyse du social et de la sociabilité (GRASS), a specialised group of sociologists within the CNRS.

Books
 Le Psychanalysme, 1973
 L'Ordre psychiatrique, 1977 (Translated into English in 1988: The Regulation of Madness: The Origins of Incarceration in France)
 La Gestion des risques, Minuit, 1981
 La Société psychiatrique avancée, 1979
 Les Métamorphoses de la question sociale, une chronique du salariat, Fayard, 1995. (Translated into English in 2002: From Manual Workers to Wage Laborers: Transformation of the Social Question)
 Propriété privée, propriété sociale, propriété de soi (avec Claudine Haroche), 2001.
 L'Insécurité sociale : qu'est-ce qu'être protégé?, Éd. du Seuil, 2003.
 La discrimination négative, 2007
 La montée des incertitudes : Travail, protections, statut de l'individu, Ed. du Seuil, 2009

References

1933 births
2013 deaths
French sociologists
Academic staff of the School for Advanced Studies in the Social Sciences
French male writers